Idaho has two congressional districts. A state since 1890, it gained its second seat in the U.S. House for the 1912 election. Both seats were at-large selections on the ballot (entire state) for three elections, until the two districts were established prior to the 1918 election.

Current districts and representatives
List of members of the United States House delegation from Idaho, district boundary maps, and the district political ratings according to the CPVI. The delegation has a total of 2 members, both with the Republican party.

First district

The 1st district seat encompasses the northern and most of the southwestern portion of the state. Starting at the Canada–U.S. border, it includes all areas in the Pacific Time Zone and follows the western border to the southwestern corner. It formerly included most of the state capital, Boise, but with redistricting in 2012, northeast Ada County, including most of the Boise city limits, is now within the 2nd district. Meridian, Eagle, and west Boise south of Interstate 84 remain in the first district as are all areas north of Boise, including McCall, Lewiston, Moscow, and Coeur d'Alene.

It is represented by Russ Fulcher, a Republican first elected in 2018.

Second district

The 2nd district seat encompasses the eastern part of the state. It includes all of Pocatello, Idaho Falls, Twin Falls, and Rexburg. It extends to southwest Idaho to Elmore County, and includes most of the Boise city limits in northeast Ada County.

It is represented by Mike Simpson, a Republican first elected in 1998.

Historical and present district boundaries
Table of United States congressional district boundary maps in the State of Idaho, presented chronologically. All redistricting events that took place in Idaho between 1973 and 2013 are shown.

See also
List of United States congressional districts

References